Red Ketchup is a cult Quebec comic book series featuring FBI's crazed rogue agent, Steve "Red" Ketchup. In 2023, Red Ketchup will be the centerpiece of an animated series directed by Martin Villeneuve and produced by Sphere Animation.

The character
Steve "Red" Ketchup — an albino empowered by chemical means — is a former police officer, now FBI agent. Ruthless and violent, a combatant skilled in both armed and unarmed fighting techniques, he appears to be invulnerable, apparently through a combination of being incredibly fit, having a high pain threshold, and drug overdose. This antihero, with his Grace Jones style red hairdo with the physique of Arnold Schwarzenegger, always wearing a blue suit and sunglasses, has been vaguely inspired by Jack Lord from the Hawaii Five-O TV series, and Michael Murphy (Brewster McCloud). Ketchup is a veteran of the Vietnam War.

History of the graphic novels

Red Ketchup first appeared in 1982 as a supporting character in the popular Michel Risque comics series by Pierre Fournier and Réal Godbout, published as a monthly serial in the legendary humor magazine Croc. Unexpectedly, the character was an instant hit with readers. The early Red Ketchup adventures were first collected into graphic novels in the late 80's by Croc Publishing of Montreal and Dargaud of France. The entire collection is currently in print for the French-speaking world from La Pastèque of Montreal.

In La Vie en rouge ("Seeing Red"), Ketchup is recruited by a secret society of Knights Templar with world domination in mind, and Kamarade Ultra ("Komrade Ultra") takes Red from the frozen wastes of Antarctica to the streets of Soviet-era Moscow, visiting mayhem and provoking diplomatic incidents along the way.

In Red Ketchup contre Red Ketchup ("Red Ketchup vs. Red Ketchup"), our indestructible hero goes up against an army of killer clones of himself, unleashed by an ex-Nazi scientist bent on kicking off the Fourth Reich.

In Red Ketchup s'est échappé ("Red Ketchup has Escaped!"), our hero quits the FBI and establishes himself as a private detective and bodyguard in Los Angeles. He is soon hired as stuntman in a harebrained grade-Z film loosely based on his own life, gets embroiled in a sordid case of human trafficking and he reunites with his sister Sally, whom he hasn't seen in 25 years.

In Le Couteau aztèque ("The Aztec Knife"), a catatonic Red Ketchup is led by his sister Sally to a South American shaman who, to shock Ketchup back to his senses, sends him back and forth through time, riding a magical jaguar. Ketchup's timeslips has him interacting with Moses, Attila the Hun, Napoleon and the emperor Montezuma, and repeatedly upsetting the very course of history.

In L'Oiseau aux sept surfaces ("The Bird with Seven Faces"), Ketchup, back with the FBI, is given a bogus mission, basically meant to keep him out of trouble. Tasked with saving the all-American Thanksgiving turkey from foreign threats, Ketchup somehow ends up in Japan investigating sightings of Godzilla-size farm animals. In Échec au King ("Viva Las Ketchup"), Red is charged with probing paranormal and cryptozoological mysteries, and the Holy Grail of Conspiracy Theories… The Search for Elvis!

In Red Ketchup en Enfer ("Red Ketchup Goes to Hell"), Ketchup dies spectacularly — yet again — but this time it sticks! Landing in the afterlife, he is banished to Hell where Lucifer himself hires him to bring some semblance of order to the chaos of Hades. Soon, harried denizens of the Infernal Regions begin leaving for The Surface and start popping up on Earth.

In Elixir X, Ketchup's archenemy Doctor Künt (first seen in Kamarade Ultra) has stumbled upon a possible Fountain of Youth, merchandized as a face cream by a reckless pharmaceutical company. The anti-wrinkle formula is a runaway success but for one unfortunate side effect: Users tend to fly into sudden, uncontrollable and murderous rage! Elixir X, the ninth volume in the series, has been released on October 19, 2017.

Pierre Fournier and Réal Godbout have both been inducted into the Canadian Comic Book Creator Hall of Fame, in 2008 and 2009, respectively.

Adaptations
In June 2022, Corus Entertainment announced that it had ordered an animated adaptation of Red Ketchup directed by Martin Villeneuve and produced by Sphere Animation, which will air in French on Télétoon (via Télétoon la nuit) and in English on Adult Swim in 2023.

Albums
 La Vie en rouge ("Seeing Red"), volume 1, La Pastèque (2007)
 Kamarade Ultra, Croc Albums (1988) / Reprint, volume 2, La Pastèque (2008)
 Red Ketchup contre Red Ketchup ("Red Ketchup vs. Red Ketchup"), Croc Albums (1992) / Reprint, volume 3, La Pastèque (2009)
 Red Ketchup s'est échappé ! ("Red Ketchup has Escaped!"), Croc Albums (1994) / Reprint, volume 4, La Pastèque (2010)
 Le couteau Aztèque ("The Aztec Knife"), volume 5, La Pastèque (2012)
 L'oiseau aux sept surfaces ("The Bird with Seven Faces"), volume 6, La Pastèque (2013)
 Échec au King ("Viva Las Ketchup"), volume 7, La Pastèque (2015)
 Red Ketchup en Enfer ("Red Ketchup Goes to Hell"), volume 8, La Pastèque (2016)
 Élixir X ("Elixir X"), volume 9, La Pastèque (2017)

Sources

 Red Ketchup at International Hero
 Red Ketchup on the big screen at BULB

References

External links
 La Pastèque Official Site 
 Red Ketchup at International Hero
 Red Ketchup in production at BULB
 Pierre Fournier’s “Frankensteinia”

French comic strips
Quebec comics
Canadian comics characters
French-language comics
Science fiction comics
1982 comics debuts
Comics characters introduced in 1982
Adventure comics
Satirical comics
Spy comics
Comic strip duos
Fictional Federal Bureau of Investigation personnel
Fictional characters with albinism
Fictional drug addicts
Dargaud titles
2020s Canadian animated television series
2023 Canadian television series debuts
Teletoon original programming